Siyun Sar (also Romanized as Si’yūn Sar) is a village in Tula Rud Rural District, in the Central District of Talesh County, Gilan Province, Iran. At the 2006 census, its population was 37, in 9 families.

References 

Populated places in Talesh County